Oscar Ferdinand Youngdahl (October 13, 1893 – February 3, 1946) was an American lawyer and politician from Minnesota. He was the older brother of Minnesota Governor and United States federal judge Luther Youngdahl.

Youngdahl was born in Minneapolis, Minnesota and attended local public schools. He began his undergraduate education at Hamline University in St. Paul, Minnesota, but ultimately graduated from Gustavus Adolphus College in St. Peter, Minnesota in 1916. Afterward, Youngdahl served as a high school principal in Ortonville, Minnesota, also doubling as the school's drama and public-speaking instructor. In 1918, he enlisted in the U.S. Navy and served until 1919, attaining the rank of Seaman Second Class. Changing career direction again, Youngdahl began selling bonds and securities in the Twin Cities while simultaneously attending law school. He graduated from William Mitchell College of Law (then the Minnesota College of Law) in 1925 and began practicing in Minneapolis. He unsuccessfully ran for state attorney general eleven years later.

Youngdahl resurrected his political career in 1938, when he was elected to the U.S. House of Representatives. He won reelection in 1940, but failed to receive his Republican Party's nomination in 1942. Returning to Minneapolis, he practiced law until his death in 1946.

References

External links

1893 births
1946 deaths
Politicians from Minneapolis
Military personnel from Minneapolis
American people of Swedish descent
Minnesota lawyers
Gustavus Adolphus College alumni
Hamline University alumni
William Mitchell College of Law alumni
Republican Party members of the United States House of Representatives from Minnesota
20th-century American politicians
Lawyers from Minneapolis
United States Navy personnel of World War I
United States Navy sailors